Sergeant Charles Breyer (June 19, 1844 to	September 9, 1914) was an English soldier who fought in the American Civil War. Breyer received the country's highest award for bravery during combat, the Medal of Honor, for his action during the First Battle of Rappahannock Station in Virginia on 23 August 1862. He was honored with the award on 8 July 1896.

Biography
Breyer was born in England on 19 June 1844 and enlisted into the 90th Pennsylvania Volunteer Infantry at Philadelphia, Pennsylvania. He died on 9 September 1914 and his remains are interred at the Limerick Church Burial Ground in Pennsylvania.

Medal of Honor citation

See also

List of American Civil War Medal of Honor recipients: A–F

References

1844 births
1914 deaths
English-born Medal of Honor recipients
English emigrants to the United States
People of Pennsylvania in the American Civil War
Union Army officers
United States Army Medal of Honor recipients
American Civil War recipients of the Medal of Honor